Port Meadville Airport  is a public use airport located three nautical miles (3.5 mi, 5.6 km) west of the central business district of Meadville, in Crawford County, Pennsylvania, United States. It is included in the FAA's National Plan of Integrated Airport Systems for 2011–2015, which categorized it as a general aviation facility.

Although many U.S. airports use the same three-letter location identifier for the FAA and IATA, this airport is assigned GKJ by the FAA and MEJ by the IATA.

Facilities and aircraft 
It has one runway designated 7/25 with an asphalt surface measuring 5,001 by 75 feet (1,524 x 23 m).

The airport also has one 50 feet x 50 feet (15 x 15 m) concrete helipad that serves as the home base for Stat MedEvac 7, a regional air and ground critical care transport system.

For the 12-month period ending May 21, 2019, the airport had 13,369 aircraft operations, an average of 37 per day: 97% general aviation, 2% air taxi, and 1% military. At that time there were 17 aircraft based at this airport: 77% single-engine, 12% multi-engine, 6% jet, and 6% helicopter.

References

External links 
 Official website: www.portmeadvilleairport.com
 Port Meadville Airport (GKJ) from Pennsylvania DOT airport directory
 Aerial photo as of 7 April 1993 from USGS The National Map
 

Airports in Pennsylvania
County airports in Pennsylvania
Transportation buildings and structures in Crawford County, Pennsylvania